Léon Schmit (born 29 March 1947) is a retired Luxembourgian football defender.

References

1947 births
Living people
Luxembourgian footballers
Jeunesse Esch players
Association football defenders
Luxembourg international footballers